Robert Hudson (born 1973) is a British novelist and comedy writer who has written journalism, particularly on sport and digital media, for many UK newspapers.

Early life and education 
Hudson was born in Zimbabwe, raised in Essex, and lives in Kilburn, London. He was educated at Jesus College, Cambridge, where he received a Ph.D. in intellectual history.

Career 
In 2007, the comedy musical Sherlock Holmes (the early years), for which he co-wrote the book, won the Theater for the American Musical award at the New York Musical Theatre Festival.

His novel The Kilburn Social Club, about a Premiership football club run on idealistic principles in an alternative version of modern London, was published by Vintage in 2009 and widely reviewed.

Since 2010, he has been curator and founder of the Kilburn-based comedy storytelling night Tall Tales, which has featured John Finnemore and Marie Phillips among others.

His comedy series Warhorses of Letters, co-written with Marie Phillips, has been recorded for BBC Radio 4 starring Stephen Fry, Daniel Rigby, and Tamsin Greig and was first broadcast in October 2011. Series 2 was broadcast at the end of 2012. The book of the series is being crowd-funded through the Unbound platform.

Books

References

External links 
  publisher's book webpage
  — official author site
  — official website

21st-century British novelists
Living people
1973 births
British male novelists
21st-century British male writers